Howard Edelson (born April 25, 1960) is an American political strategist, campaign manager, and regular political media commentator. Edelson is the founding partner of Michigan-based political consulting business, The Edelson Group. He was the campaign manager for former Michigan Governor Jennifer Granholm's successful 2006 re-election campaign. He has led other successful ballot measures in Michigan for affordable energy and tax reform

Edelson has also served as Chief of Staff to Congressman Milton Robert Carr and was the Head of International Business Development and Legislative Affairs at the Michigan Economic Development Corporation.

Personal life

Edelson is a resident of Ann Arbor, Michigan.

References

External links
 The Edelson Group official website
 Group Bloomberg Company Profile

American political consultants
American campaign managers
Michigan Democrats
Living people
Michigan State University alumni
People from Ann Arbor, Michigan
1960 births